Isolabiinae is a subfamily of earwigs, and contains four genera. All of them were cited by Steinmann in his book, The Animal Kingdom.

References

External links 
 The Earwig Research Centre's Isolabiinae database Source for references: type Isolabiinae in the "subfamily" field and click "search".

Anisolabididae
Dermaptera subfamilies